According to Greek mythology, Ion (Íon, gen.: Ἴωνος, Íonos, "going") was the illegitimate child of Creüsa, the daughter of Erechtheus and wife of Xuthus.

Mythology 
One story of Ion is told in the tragedy play Ion by Euripides. Creusa conceived Ion with Apollo then she abandoned the child. Apollo asked Hermes to take Ion from his cradle. Ion was saved (and raised) by a priestess of the Delphic Oracle.  Later, Xuthus was informed by the oracle that the first person he met when leaving the oracle would be his son, and this person was Ion. He interpreted it to mean that he had fathered Ion, when, in fact, Apollo was giving him Ion as an adoptive son. Creusa was planning on killing Ion due to her jealousy that Xuthus had a son while she was still childless. At the same time, Ion was planning on doing harm to Creusa. In the end, Creusa found out that Ion was her child, and only Xuthus' adopted child.

In the other accounts, Ion was the founder of Helike (the modern Eliki) in Achaea. Ion was the son of Xuthus (rather than Apollo) who was brought to the area during the reign of king Selinus. He married the girl named Helike who succeeded to the throne. He built the city of Eliki after the name of his wife, and made it the capital of the kingdom. Later he took an expedition against Eleusis (now Elefsina) with the help of the Athenians and in the battle he was killed near Eleusis. According to some accounts, Ion was the father of Ellops, founder of Ellopia, and possibly of Aïclus (Aiklos) and Cothus (Kothos). These last two founded the Euboean towns of Eretria and Cerinthus, respectively.

Ion was also believed to have founded a primary tribe of Greece, the Ionians. He has often been identified with Javan, who is mentioned in the Hebrew Bible as the ancestor of the Greek people, but in the Bible, Javan is a son of Noah's son Japheth. The earlier Greek form of the name was *Ἰάϝων "Iáwōn", which, with the loss of the digamma, later became Ἰάων Iáōn, or plural Iáones, as seen in epic poetry. In addition, Dionysius Periegetes, Dionysius the Voyager, of Alexandria, in his Description of the Known World ver. 416  mentions a river in Arcadia called Iaon. This river Iaon is further alluded to in Hesiod's Hymns of Callimachus, Hymn to Jupiter 22. This river has also been connected to the earlier forms of the name.

Genealogy of Hellenes

See also
 Yona – covers other names for the Greeks derived from Ion and the Ionians, found from the Near East to India

Notes

References 

Euripides, The Complete Greek Drama, edited by Whitney J. Oates and Eugene O'Neill Jr. in two volumes. 1. Ion, translated by Robert Potter. New York. Random House. 1938. Online version at the Perseus Digital Library.
Euripides, Euripidis Fabulae. vol. 2. Gilbert Murray. Oxford. Clarendon Press, Oxford. 1913. Greek text available at the Perseus Digital Library.
Hesiod, Catalogue of Women from Homeric Hymns, Epic Cycle, Homerica translated by Evelyn-White, H G. Loeb Classical Library Volume 57. London: William Heinemann, 1914. Online version at theio.com
Homer, The Iliad with an English Translation by A.T. Murray, Ph.D. in two volumes. Cambridge, MA., Harvard University Press; London, William Heinemann, Ltd. 1924. Online version at the Perseus Digital Library.
Homer. Homeri Opera in five volumes. Oxford, Oxford University Press. 1920. Greek text available at the Perseus Digital Library.
Pseudo-Apollodorus, The Library with an English Translation by Sir James George Frazer, F.B.A., F.R.S. in 2 Volumes, Cambridge, MA, Harvard University Press; London, William Heinemann Ltd. 1921. Online version at the Perseus Digital Library. Greek text available from the same website.

Children of Apollo
Demigods in classical mythology
Attican characters in Greek mythology
Ionian mythology
Mythology of Achaea